Solar cycle 16 was the sixteenth solar cycle since 1755, when extensive recording of solar sunspot activity began. The solar cycle lasted 10.1 years, beginning in August 1923 and ending in September 1933.  The maximum smoothed sunspot number observed during the solar cycle was 130.2 (April 1928), and the starting minimum was 9.4. During the minimum transit from solar cycle 16 to 17, there were a total of 568 days with no sunspots.

Newspaper reports during this period note effects on telegraph systems, but also (in March 1924, January 1926, October 1926, and October 1927) on radio transmission.

See also
List of solar cycles

References

Solar cycles